Dunwich is a village in Suffolk, England. 

Dunwich may also refer to:

Places
 Dunwich (UK Parliament constituency), Rotten Borough
 Dunwich, Queensland, an Australian town
 Dutton/Dunwich, Ontario, a Canadian municipality

Art, entertainment, and media
 Dunwich (Lovecraft), H.P. Lovecraft's fictional location
 Dunwich (band), an Italian symphonic metal band